Eschive d'Ibelin (1253–1312) was suo jure Lady of Beirut in 1282–1312. She was the daughter of John II of Beirut (died 1264), lord of Beirut, and of Alice de la Roche, and a member of the influential Ibelin family.

Life

She first married, in 1274, Humphrey de Montfort, lord of Tyre (died 1284).

Lady of Beirut
She became lady of Beirut on the death of her sister Isabelle of Beirut in 1282.

After Humphrey's death, she remarried in 1291 Guy of Lusignan, constable of Cyprus (died 1302).

In 1291, Emir ‘Alam al-Din Sanjar al-Shuja‘i al-Mansuri, a Muslim general under al-Ashraf Khalil, marched on Beirut, which had only a small garrison. Eschive thought she was secure because she had signed a truce with Qalawun, father of Khalil. Al-Shuja‘i summoned the commanders of the garrison and arrested them. Seeing the commanders arrested, the population fled by sea. Beirut was taken by the Muslims on July 31. Al-Shuja‘i ordered the razing of its walls and castles and turned its cathedral into a mosque.

Claimant to the Duchy of Athens 

In 1308, Eschive's cousin Guy II de la Roche, Duke of Athens, died without issue, leaving a succession crisis in the duchy. Eschive travelled to the Morea in the same year to claim her rights to the duchy of Athens. She was one of the two claimants, as the daughter of Guy's aunt Alice; her rival, Walter V of Brienne, was the son of Guy's aunt Isabella, a younger sister of Alice. Upon her return journey from Morea, Eschive was shipwrecked. Since Athens was a fief of the Principality of Achaea, the decision was in the hands of Philip I of Taranto, Prince of Achaea, and his suzerain and elder brother Robert of Naples. The two referred the question to the High Court of Achaea in 1309, which met at Glarentza and declared Walter the heir on the pragmatic grounds that he was male and an active soldier, better suited to defend the Duchy. The disappointed Eschive thereupon appealed to the Virgin Mary before the altar of St Francis at Glarentza, asking that Walter and the judges die without heirs of the body if they had wrongly judged against her. Eschive in fact outlived Walter, who was killed at the Battle of Halmyros in 1311, but died the following year in Nicosia and was buried there.

Issue 
With Humphrey de Montfort, lord of Tyre (died 1284), they had:
 Three sons and one daughter, all who died young
 Amaury de Montfort (died 1304)
 Rupen de Montfort (died 1313)

With Guy of Lusignan, constable of Cyprus (died 1302), they had:
 Hugh IV (1295–1359) king of Cyprus, married firstly Maria of Ibelin, then Alice of Ibelin
 Isabelle de Lusignan (born 1298), who in 1322 married Eudes de Dampierre (died 1330)

References

Sources

1253 births
1312 deaths
People of the Kingdom of Cyprus
Women of the Crusader states
House of Ibelin
History of Beirut
Women of the Duchy of Athens
13th-century women rulers
14th-century women rulers